Stancho Penchev (born 9 May 1940) is a Bulgarian weightlifter. He competed at the 1964 Summer Olympics as a light heavyweight  and the 1972 Summer Olympics as a heavyweight. He was ranked number one in Bulgaria for his weight class in 1963, 1966, 1969, 1971, 1973 and 1974.

References

External links
 

1940 births
Living people
Bulgarian male weightlifters
Olympic weightlifters of Bulgaria
Weightlifters at the 1964 Summer Olympics
Weightlifters at the 1972 Summer Olympics
Sportspeople from Plovdiv
20th-century Bulgarian people
21st-century Bulgarian people